Pericallis is a small genus of 15 species of flowering plants in the family Asteraceae, native to the Canary Islands, Madeira and Azores. The genus includes herbaceous plants and small subshrubs. In the past, the genus was often included in either Cineraria or Senecio.

The florist's cineraria (Pericallis × hybrida) is a hybrid between P. cruenta and P. lanata.

Species
Species include:
Pericallis appendiculata (L.f.) B.Nord.
Pericallis aurita (L'Hér.) B.Nord.
Pericallis cruenta (L'Hér.) Bolle
Pericallis echinata (L.f.) B.Nord.
Pericallis hadrosoma (Svent.) B.Nord.
Pericallis hansenii (G.Kunkel) Sunding
Pericallis lanata (L'Hér.) B.Nord.
Pericallis malvifolia (L'Hér.) B.Nord.
Pericallis menezesii  R. Jardim, K. E. Jones, Carine & M. Seq.
Pericallis multiflora (L'Hér.) B.Nord.
Pericallis murrayi (Bornm.) B.Nord.
Pericallis papyracea (DC.) B.Nord.
Pericallis steetzii (Bolle) B.Nord.
Pericallis tussilaginis (L'Hér.) D.Don
Pericallis webbii (Sch. Bip.) Bolle

References

External links

 
Asteraceae genera
Endemic flora of Macaronesia